Mary Killiktee is a Canadian Inuk politician, who was elected to the Legislative Assembly of Nunavut in the 2021 Nunavut general election. She represents the electoral district of Uqqummiut.

Prior to her election to the legislature, she was mayor of Qikiqtarjuaq.

References

Living people
Members of the Legislative Assembly of Nunavut
Women MLAs in Nunavut
Inuit politicians
21st-century Canadian politicians
21st-century Canadian women politicians
Inuit from Nunavut
People from Qikiqtarjuaq
Mayors of places in Nunavut
Women mayors of places in Nunavut
Year of birth missing (living people)